K.Bhta (abbreviated from the , Konstantínos Vī́ta; also known as Konstantinos Beta and Κ.Β.) is a Greek artist. He was born in Melbourne, Australia, where he studied painting and art history before moving to Athens, where he studied graphic design. In 1992 he formed the electronic band Stereo Nova, with which he recorded five official albums. In 1996, Stereo Nova disbanded and he began to pursue a solo career.  He has composed music for documentaries, movies, and theatrical plays, and received international attention for his contribution to the Opening Ceremony of the Athens 2004 Olympic Games.

Records
 a game (Ένα παιχνίδι) feat. Popi Asteriadi (FM Records) / 1998
 super stella (Planetworks/EMI) spring 1999
 angel baby (olon music) 2001/music from the play
 the child e.p (planetworks/Columbia) spring 2000
 meta feat. Dimitra Galani (Universal) / 2001
 gia sena me agapi (Eros music) 2002
 thita (Tomorrow recordings) spring 2002
 movement (Tomorrow recordings) May 2003
 transformations (Seirios) universal / July 2003
 agria xloh(Tomorrow recordings/Eros music) 2004    LP
 koma9205 (Tomorrow recordings/Eros music) 2005 DVD
 2 (Legend) 2006 — The soundtrack for the play of the same name directed by Dimitris Papaioannou
 argos (Lyra Records) 2007
enosi (Lyra Records) 2009
 Chryssalida (Inner Ear records) 2012

References

External links
 
 kbhta.gr

Living people
Greek musicians
1961 births
Musicians from Athens